Qosqophryne mancoinca is a species of frog in the family Strabomantidae.
It is only found in Santa Teresa, Cusco, Peru, between 3,519 and 3,707 meters above sea level.
Its natural habitat is high altitude montane grasslands and cloud forests. It was originally classified as a member of Bryophryne, but was later moved to the newly created genus Qosqophryne.

References

Strabomantidae
Endemic fauna of Peru
Amphibians of Peru
Amphibians described in 2017